"The Blues Are Still Blue" is the second single from Scottish indie pop band Belle & Sebastian's seventh studio album, The Life Pursuit (2006). The track was released on 3 April 2006 on Rough Trade Records and was produced by Tony Hoffer. The single reached number 25 on the UK Singles Chart, becoming the band's last top 40 hit to date. The song is their only top-50 hit in Australia, where it peaked at number 43 in June 2006 as an extended play.

Track listings
All songs were written by Belle & Sebastian

CD
 "The Blues Are Still Blue" – 4:08
 "The Life Pursuit" – 4:34
 "Mr. Richard" – 2:35

7-inch vinyl
 "The Blues Are Still Blue" – 4:09
 "Whiskey in the Jar" – 4:44

DVD
 "The Blues Are Still Blue" (video)
 "Roy Walker" (live at The Botanics)

The Blues Are Still Blue (Australian 2006 Tour EP)
 "The Blues are Still Blue" (From the UK ‘The Blues Are Still Blue’ single)
 "I Took a Long Hard Look" (From the UK ‘Funny Little Frog’ maxi CDS)
 "The Life Pursuit" (From the UK ‘The Blues Are Still Blue’ maxi CDS)
 "Whiskey in the Jar" (From the UK ‘The Blues Are Still Blue’ 7")
 "Funny Little Frog" (From the UK ‘Funny Little Frog’ single)
 "Meat and Potatoes" (From the UK ‘Funny Little Frog’ maxi CDS)
 "Mr Richard" (From the UK ‘The Blues Are Still Blue’ maxi CDS)
 "The Eighth Station of the Cross Kebab House" (From the UK ‘Funny Little Frog’ maxi CDS)

Charts

Release history

References

External links
 "The Blues Are Still Blue" at belleandsebastian.com

Belle and Sebastian songs
2006 singles
2006 songs
Rough Trade Records singles
Song recordings produced by Tony Hoffer